Gondwana Gantantra Party or GGP is a state party in India, Founded by Hira Singh Markam. It primarily works for the tribal community and its politics.

History
GGP was formed in 1991 to plead for the rights of the Gondi people, and to establish a separate Indian state of Gondwana in central India.

In Elections
In the Vidhan Sabha elections in Uttar Pradesh 2002 GGP had eight candidates, who together mustered 11 262 votes.

In Vidhan Sabha elections in Madhya Pradesh 2003 GGP had launched 61 candidates, who together mustered 512 102 votes. Three were elected.

In the Vidhan Sabha elections in Chhattisgarh 2003 GGP had 41 candidates, but no-one was elected. In total the party received 156 916 votes.

In the 2004 Lok Sabha elections the party presented candidates from Madhya Pradesh, Chhattisgarh, Bihar, Uttar Pradesh and Maharashtra.

Recent Developments
The Gondwana Ganatantra Party formed a pre-poll alliance with the Samajwadi Party for the 2018 Madhya Pradesh Legislative Assembly election.

External links

References

Political parties established in 1991
1991 establishments in Madhya Pradesh